Frédéric Sy was a French astronomer and a discoverer of minor planets.

He worked at the Paris Observatory from 1879 to 1887, and as the assistant astronomer at the Algiers Observatory, North Africa, from 1887 to 1918. While working in Algiers he published extensively on the subjects of minor asteroids and comets, and was a colleague of astronomer François Gonnessiat.

Sy was responsible for the discovery and naming of two asteroids, 858 El Djezaïr and 859 Bouzaréah. The names were drawn from locations near the discovering Algiers Observatory.

He was awarded the Valz Prize (Prix Valz) in 1919 by the French Academy of Sciences. The asteroid 1714 Sy was named after him in 1951.

References 
 

20th-century French astronomers
Discoverers of asteroids

19th-century French astronomers
Year of birth missing
Year of death missing